Valeria Cătescu (born 17 September 1953) is a Romanian rower. She competed in the women's coxed four event at the 1980 Summer Olympics.

References

External links 
 
 
 

1953 births
Living people
Romanian female rowers
Olympic rowers of Romania
Rowers at the 1980 Summer Olympics
People from Galați County